Walter Lübcke (22 August 1953 – 2 June 2019) was a German local politician in Hesse and a member of the Christian Democratic Union (CDU). On 2 June 2019, he was assassinated at his home by a neo-Nazi extremist. Stephan Ernst was arrested on 15 June 2019, and confessed to the crime on 25 June 2019. The Federal Prosecutor's Office classified the murder as a political assassination.

Early life and education 
After attending primary and secondary school in Edertal, he finished a two-year vocational training in Bad Wildungen in 1969 to briefly work in a local bank afterwards. During his voluntary military service between 1975 and 1983, he completed his human resources management training and later worked as an assistant in the press office of the art exhibition documenta 7. Concurrently, he studied at the University of Kassel from 1981 to 1986, graduating with a degree in economics. In 1991, he successfully defended his doctoral dissertation on "The early economic planning attempts in the Soviet Union: 1924–1928; Socialism between utopia and pragmatism".

Career
Lübcke served as the municipal-oversight president of the governmental district (Regierungsbezirk) of Kassel, one of three in the federal state of Hesse, for 10 years.

Lübcke was known for his pro-migrant views. He received death threats after stating at a public gathering that people were free to leave the country if they opposed helping those claiming asylum.

Assassination

He had been shot in the head with a Rossi revolver at close range. On 15 June 2019, 45-year-old suspect Stephan Ernst was arrested. Ernst was known to have held extreme right-wing political views and had links to the far-right National Democratic Party of Germany (NPD) and the German branch of the British neo-Nazi terrorist group Combat 18 (C18). Ernst had been previously convicted for knife and bomb attacks against targets connected to ethnic minorities in Germany.

Aftermath
Two others, Elmar J. and Markus H. were arrested on suspicion of ties to the killer.

An investigation by the Federal Office for the Protection of the Constitution (BfV) found that a doomsday prepper network Nordkreuz (German: Northern Cross) had ammunition, firearms, and body bags, as well as "kill lists" for politicians after acquisition of a database of 25,000 names, which they shared on the messaging app Telegram.

See also
 Murder of Jo Cox, a British Member of Parliament (MP), by neo-Nazi Thomas Mair in 2016

References

External links
 

1953 births
2019 deaths
20th-century German politicians
21st-century German politicians
Assassinated German politicians
Christian Democratic Union of Germany politicians
Deaths by firearm in Germany
German Protestants
German terrorism victims
Members of the Landtag of Hesse
People from Kassel (district)
University of Kassel alumni
Recipients of the Medal of the Order of Merit of the Federal Republic of Germany